In mathematics, geometric class field theory is an extension of class field theory to higher-dimensional geometrical objects: much the same way as class field theory describes the abelianization of the Galois group of a local or global field, geometric class field theory describes the abelianized fundamental group of higher dimensional schemes in terms of data related to algebraic cycles.

References

 

Class field theory
Algebraic geometry